Lavalius Cyrone Gordon (born 1937) is an American former basketball player and coach. He played college basketball for the Oklahoma State Cowboys from 1958 to 1961, where he was the first African-American to play for the team. Gordon served as the head coach of the Texas Southern Tigers from 1969 to 1973.

Gordon was born in Abbeville, Mississippi, and was raised in Memphis, Tennessee, where he played basketball at Booker T. Washington High School. The head coach of the Memphis Tigers, Bob Vanatta, told Gordon that Cowboys head coach Henry Iba was prepared to integrate his team and recruited Gordon on behalf of Iba; Gordon committed to play for the Cowboys without visiting the university's campus. As a guard, Gordon had considered himself as an offensive player but was converted to become the team's defensive specialist by Iba and assigned to guard the opponents' best scorers. He suffered from the effects of racism and segregation as the only black player on the Cowboys but credited his teammates with helping to embrace him.

Gordon graduated from Oklahoma State University in 1961 with a bachelor of science degree in secondary education. He earned a master's degree in administration and supervision from the University of Memphis and a master's degree in physical education from Texas Southern University.

Gordon was named head coach of the Texas Southern Tigers in 1969 after serving as the basketball coach at Carver High School the three previous years. He amassed a 63–43 record over four seasons. Gordon resigned as head coach of the Tigers on September 5, 1973.

Gordon was honored by Oklahoma State University as the grand marshal of homecoming in 2013 and is a life member of the OSU Alumni Association. His son, Lavalius Jr., played college football and basketball for the North Texas Mean Green. His grandson, Trent, plays college football for the Arkansas Razorbacks.

References

External links
College statistics

1937 births
Living people
African-American basketball coaches
African-American basketball players
American men's basketball coaches
American men's basketball players
Basketball coaches from Tennessee
Basketball players from Memphis, Tennessee
Guards (basketball)
High school basketball coaches in Tennessee
Oklahoma State Cowboys basketball players
Sportspeople from Memphis, Tennessee
Texas Southern Tigers men's basketball coaches
Texas Southern University alumni
University of Memphis alumni
21st-century African-American people
20th-century African-American sportspeople
People from Abbeville, Mississippi